Komovi is a mountain and mountain range in eastern Montenegro. It is a part of the Dinaric Alps.

The Komovi are located between the Montenegrin-Albanian Prokletije mountain range which borders them to the south and east, the Bjelasica mountain to the north, and Tara river to the west. Administratively, the Komovi mountains are divided between the municipalities of Kolašin and Andrijevica. Traditionally, the Komovi massif was the location of katuns (groups of shepherds' summer cottages) used by the Montenegrin tribes of Vasojevići and Kuči.

Since 2018, the Komovi have been classified as a nature park, i.e. as a protected natural area, due to their ecological significance, and abundance of the flora and fauna.

Peaks
The six highest peaks of the Komovi are:

 Kom Kučki 
 Stari vrh 
 Kom Ljevorečki 
 Kom Vasojevićki 
 Rogamski vrh 
 Bavan

References

Mountain ranges of Montenegro
Mountains of Montenegro
Kolašin Municipality
Andrijevica Municipality
Two-thousanders of Montenegro